Jovan Ćurčić (Serbian Cyrillic: Јован Ћурчић; born 4 May 1941) is a Serbian former footballer.

Honours
Partizan
 Yugoslav First League: 1960–61, 1961–62, 1962–63, 1964–65

References

1941 births
Living people
Sportspeople from Čačak
Yugoslav footballers
Serbian footballers
Association football goalkeepers
Yugoslav First League players
FK Partizan players
Borussia Mönchengladbach players
RFC Liège players
K. Patro Eisden Maasmechelen players
Yugoslav expatriate footballers
Expatriate footballers in Germany
Yugoslav expatriate sportspeople in Germany
Expatriate footballers in the Netherlands
Yugoslav expatriate sportspeople in the Netherlands
Expatriate footballers in Belgium
Yugoslav expatriate sportspeople in Belgium